Vivekananda Mission Mahavidyalaya, established in 1968, is one of the oldest colleges in Purba Medinipur district. It offers undergraduate courses in arts, commerce and sciences. It is affiliated to  Vidyasagar University.

Departments

Science
 Botany
 Chemistry
 Computer Science
 Geography
 Mathematics
 Nutrition
 Physics
 Zoology
 Environmental Science

Arts and Commerce

 Bengali
 Education
 English
 History
 Music
 Philosophy
 Physical
 Education
 Political
 Science
 Sanskrit
 Sociology
 Commerce

Accreditation
Recently, Vivekananda Mission Mahavidyalaya has been re-accredited and awarded B+ grade by the National Assessment and Accreditation Council (NAAC). The college is also recognized by the University Grants Commission (UGC).

See also

References

External links
Vivekananda Mission Mahavidyalaya

Universities and colleges in Purba Medinipur district
Colleges affiliated to Vidyasagar University
Haldia
Educational institutions established in 1968
1968 establishments in West Bengal